167P/CINEOS is a large periodic comet and active, grey centaur, approximately  in diameter, orbiting the Sun outside the orbit of Saturn in the Solar System. It was discovered on August 10, 2004, by astronomers with the CINEOS survey at Gran Sasso in Italy. It is one of only a handful known Chiron-type comets.

Description 

Due to its high Jupiter tisserand of 3.5, and a semi-major axis larger than that of Jupiter, 167P/CINEOS is classified as a Chiron-type comet, named after the groups namesake, 2060 Chiron or 95P/Chiron, designated as both minor planet and comet.

167P/CINEOS was first reported as a minor planet, designated , but was found to have a very faint asymmetric cometary coma.

In June 2039, 167P/CINEOS will pass 1.64 AU from Uranus.

References

External links 
 167P on Seiichi Yoshida's comet list
 

Chiron-type comets
Periodic comets
0167

20040810